James Stevenson (4 August 1946 – 11 March 2021) was a Scottish footballer who played as a left midfielder.

Career
Stevenson signed for Hibernian at the beginning of the 1963–64 season from Edina Hearts. On 21 March 1964, Stevenson made his debut for Hibs in a 1–0 win against St Mirren. Over the course of four years, Stevenson made 13 appearances for Hibernian, scoring once.

In 1967, Stevenson moved to England, signing for Southend United. Stevenson made 34 league appearances for Southend, signing for Brentwood Town in 1968. In 1970, Stevenson signed for Chelmsford City, following a merger between Brentwood and Chelmsford. Stevenson made 93 appearances for Chelmsford, scoring 23 times, helping the club to the 1971–72 Southern League title. In January 1971, Stevenson signed for Margate on loan, making seven appearances. In 1972, following his departure from Chelmsford, Stevenson signed for Dover, staying with the club until the 1973–74 season.

References

1946 births
2021 deaths
Footballers from Bellshill
Association football midfielders
Scottish footballers
Hibernian F.C. players
Southend United F.C. players
Brentwood Town F.C. players
Chelmsford City F.C. players
Margate F.C. players
Dover F.C. players
Scottish Football League players
English Football League players
Southern Football League players
Scotland youth international footballers